Mads Nørgaard Rasmussen (born 30 October 1993) is a Danish curler from Hvidovre, Denmark. He currently plays third on the Danish National Men's Curling Team.

Personal life
Nørgaard is currently a physiotherapy student.

Teams

References

External links

1993 births
Living people
Danish male curlers
People from Hvidovre Municipality
Curlers at the 2022 Winter Olympics
Olympic curlers of Denmark
Sportspeople from the Capital Region of Denmark
21st-century Danish people